Neil Merryweather (born Robert Neilson Lillie, December 27, 1945 – March 28, 2021) was a Canadian rock singer, bass player and songwriter. He has recorded and performed with musicians including Steve Miller, Dave Mason, Lita Ford, Billy Joel and Rick James, and released an extensive catalogue of albums.

The Just Us and The Tripp
Merryweather was born in Winnipeg, Manitoba, and began his career in Toronto during the early 1960s performing under the name Bobby Neilson.

During 1964, he joined forces with Gary Muir & The Reflections, a local group comprising Muir (vocals), Ed Roth (organ), Bill Ross (guitar), Brian Hughes (bass) and Bob Ablack (drums). Neilson's arrival prompted the group to part from Muir and the band briefly changed their name to The Ookpiks (after a native-designed stuffed toy owl that was being promoted by the Canadian government). Because another group was already using that name, they briefly switched to The Sikusis (after a different stuffed toy). After the Canadian government demanded payment for their name, the band settled on The Just Us in early 1965.

In 1965, the group recorded its lone single, "I Don't Love You" c/w "I Can Tell", for the local Quality Records label. (Some copies list the group as The Ookpiks, some The Sikusis, and some The Just Us).  Soon afterwards, Ross and new drummer Al Morrison left to take part in the formation of The Bossmen around singer David Clayton-Thomas.

Neilson, who now went by the name Neil Lillie, befriended ex-Mynah Birds singer Jimmy Livingston in Long & McQuade's music store where he worked in the backroom as an amp and guitar repairman and asked him to join a new line up of The Just Us. To complete the band, Lillie recruited former C.J. Feeney & The Spellbinders members Stan Endersby on guitar and Wayne Davis on bass.

In early 1966, The Just Us recorded an album's worth of material at Arc Sound in Toronto, with the tapes being subsequently stolen by their manager. Undeterred, the band remained a popular local draw, regularly playing at Toronto clubs like the Hawk's Nest, The In Crowd and the Gogue Inn as well as local high schools.

In June 1966, Davis left to play with Bobby Kris & The Imperials and Lillie learned to play bass in two weeks to fill the spot. Around this time, an American duo with the same name appeared on the charts and the group was forced to adopt a new name, The Group Therapy, for its show at the Varsity Arena on June 22, supporting The Byrds. When another local group surfaced with an earlier claim to The Group Therapy name, Merryweather came up with the new name, The Tripp, in September 1966.

The new group never had the opportunity to record, but did appear on the first episode of the Canadian Broadcasting Corporation’s TV program, The Sunday Show. The band remained a regular fixture on the Toronto club scene throughout late 1966 and early 1967. They opened for the top band in Toronto, the Mandala, and stole the show and afterwards were approached by Mandala guitarist and friend Domenic Troiano and his manager Riff Markowitz.  Riff became the Tripp's manager.  One of the Tripp's most prestigious shows during this period was a performance at Maple Leaf Gardens on September 24, 1966 alongside the cream of Toronto's rock bands.

With its more experimental approach to performance, The Tripp began to perform at more colourful venues like Boris’ Red Gas Room, the Devil's Den, the Flick and the Syndicate Club. Pianist Richard Bell from Ritchie Knight & The Mid-Knights briefly augmented the group in early 1967 but soon moved on to Ronnie Hawkins & The Hawks (and a few years later, Janis Joplin’s backing group Full Tilt Boogie, and the last edition of The Band).

The Mynah Birds
Soon afterwards, Lillie left the group to take up an offer from singer Ricky James Matthews (later funk star Rick James) in a new version of The Mynah Birds. The band went to Motown studios in Detroit during August 1967 and recorded "It's My Time", a song written by James and Neil Young during the group's previous incarnation. The project was shelved when the band fell apart.

James and Lillie returned to Toronto to find new musicians. Upon their return, Lillie recruited Marty Fisher (keyboards) and Gordie MacBain (drums) formerly of Bobbie Kris & The Imperials. While in search of a guitarist Merryweather ran into the drummer from The Staccatos (later to become The Five Man Electrical Band) who told him about guitarist Bruce Cockburn of The Children. Merryweather recruited Cockburn and the band was complete.  Rick was picked up by the police for a breaking and entering charge involving a Yorkville Village clothes store and was being held in jail when it was discovered that he was also a draft dodger from the US Navy.  It seemed like Rick would never be free to rejoin the new Mynah Birds so the band to stay alive decided to go it alone. Merryweather named the band The Flying Circus (this was before the Monty Python Flying Circus was formed).

Signed to Harvey Glatt's management, the group recorded a number of unreleased tracks in Toronto, including Cockburn's "Flying Circus", "She Wants To Know", "I'm Leaving You Out", "Mother", "The Elephant Song" as well as Neil's "Last Hoorah"  and Fisher and MacBain's "Where Is All The Love". At the same sessions, the band also recorded songs by Cockburn's former Children cohort, Bill Hawkins, such as "Merry Go Round", "It's a Dirty Shame", and "Little Bit Stoned".

During late 1967, the band played at Le Hibou in Ottawa and the Riverboat in Toronto and opened for Wilson Pickett at the Capitol Theatre in Ottawa and Massey Hall in Toronto. They also opened for two nights for Roy Orbison at the Capitol Theater in Ottawa. Motown offered them a contract, but Cockburn rejected the deal, refusing to give up song publishing royalties.

Merryweather was getting bored playing Cockburn's folk rock songs and longed to do a heavier form of rock. He left The Flying Circus in March 1968, and reunited with former Tripp members Ed Roth and Jimmy Livingston to form a new band. Adding ex-Fraser Loveman Group guitarist Dave Burt and drummer Gary Hall, the new group, initially dubbed 'New King Boiler' named after the iron furnace in  his grandmother's basement where they rehearsed.  Gary Hall drank so much coffee that he was soon being called "Coffee" by Neil's grandmother (the name stuck, though he chose to spell it "Coffi").  The band got three demos together with the help of an engineer friend at Arc recording studio.  Friend Bruce Palmer (former bassist for The Mynah Birds and now playing in LA with Buffalo Springfield) was in Toronto and sold the band on going to LA the way that he and Neil Young had done the years before, they decided to pile into a car and just drive to "La La Land".

'Merryweather' and subsequent recording career
The band adopted the name 'Heather Merryweather' after the title of one of the songs they recorded with lyrics by band friend, June Nelson.  Nelson was Mo Ostin's secretary at Warner Bros. Records for many years. She was also responsible for pushing the band to go to Los Angeles.  After they arrived in the summer of 1968 the boys in the band were welcomed into the home of Linda Stevens in Topanga Canyon. Stevens was a folk singer and songwriter and friend of Buffalo Springfield.  She offered not only a place to stay but allowed the band to rehearse in the house.  Heather Merryweather's first gig was to be at the Topanga Coral but the night before they were to play the Coral burned down. The Coral owners quickly rented a store on Ventura Blvd and opened the new club as Big Pink.  Heather Merryweather were the first band to play the club. During their performances the band noticed that Jimmy Livingston seemed to change and his performance fell short of what was expected.  Jimmy chose to party rather than play, and he and the band parted ways.  Merryweather took over the vocals and began writing new material. Heather Merryweather soon found themselves sharing the bill with Chicago Transit Authority at the Whisky a Go Go in Hollywood.  From that performance they were signed by the new A&R rep John Gross. Gross became the band's producer.  The band decided to shorten their name to 'Merryweather' after the album was completed. Merryweather was at Capitol Records one day to oversee the final cover art and ran into Linda Ronstadt.  Both being newly signed to Capitol they began a chat while sitting on the front steps of the Capitol Tower.  Merryweather told her about the band and she was excited about her Capitol deal and was waiting to meet up with her Stone Poneys' producer Nick Venet.  When Venet arrived she jumped up and turned to Merryweather and said "it was great meeting you Neil Merryweather!"  Merryweather liking what Linda had called him immediately ran back upstairs to see the album's cover designer Robert Lockart and had the name Neil Merryweather added to the album credits. He legally changed his name and began a long recording career as Neil Merryweather.

Merryweather's second album, Word of Mouth (released in September 1969), was a double-album of extemporaneous songs recorded in Los Angeles featuring the band jamming with numerous guests, such as Steve Miller, Barry Goldberg, Charlie Musselwhite, Dave Mason, Howard Roberts and Bobby Notkoff. Although the album was reasonably successful, the group fragmented, with Merryweather quitting after a dispute.  Merryweather ran into his old friend Rick James and told him if he wanted them he had a ready made band in Burt, Hall and Roth. Rick James recruited the guys and started the band Salt 'N' Pepper. Prior to the break, Merryweather turned down an offer from Stephen Stills to join Crosby, Stills, Nash & Young as bass player.  Merryweather and Stills had jammed at Stills' house in Topanga Canyon in the past.

Merryweather flew back to Toronto to recruit replacements, then returned with them to record the album Neil Merryweather, John Richardson and Boers for the blues label Kent in early 1970. The resulting album, credited to Merryweather, ex-The Ugly Ducklings drummer Robin Boers, guitarist John Richardson from Nucleus (and before that Lords of London), and ex-49th Parallel member J.J. Velker attracted only limited interest. Merryweather agreed to do the album for the money to support the new band. They did a follow-up album for RCA, Ivar Avenue Reunion, featuring the same basic group plus Goldberg, Musselwhite, and Merryweather's new girlfriend, ex-C.K. Strong singer Lynn Carey. The duet of Merryweather and Carey impressed the A&R department and RCA signed the duo as 'Merryweather & Carey'.

Merryweather and Lynn Carey, along with guitarist Kal David and former Merryweather bandmates Roth and Hall, recorded the Vacuum Cleaner album for RCA in 1971. Two tracks that they recorded at Kent Records under the name "Momma and Pappa Rock'n Family" (Kent 4522) were bought by RCA, also found their way onto the Vacuum Cleaner album. Merryweather was not happy with RCA firing the A&R staff that signed them and found the replacement staff to be weak and he left with the idea to form a new group with Lynn out front.  Merryweather recruited Coffi Hall as drummer and found guitarist Rick Gaxiola and keyboardist James Newton Howard.  Merryweather had put together a new hard rock band which he named Mama Lion in 1972, featuring Carey on lead vocals. He produced a "demo" recording at Paramount studio and played it for some friends and it caught the ear of Ken Mansfield.  Ken Mansfield became the new band's manager and within a week sold the band to Artie Ripp's new Family Productions label, which was a new affiliate of Famous Music. The band recorded two albums, Preserve Wildlife (which featured Neil's idea of a controversial photo of Carey appearing to nurse a tiger cub) in 1972 and Give It Everything I've Got in 1973. Merryweather also recorded with the Mama Lion lineup sans Carey, with this band calling itself Heavy Cruiser. They released two albums, the eponymous Heavy Cruiser (1972) and its followup, Lucky Dog (1973). The band was offered a management contract with Shep Gordon and was booked to open for Alice Cooper on his upcoming world tour.  Ripp scuttled the deal by quickly stealing the management.  The Alice Cooper tour was lost and the beginning of the end for the band started.  After a few small tours of small clubs was arranged by Ripp's management Mama Lion wound up in Europe where a series of events due to bad management and internal disputes caused Merryweather to let guitarist Rick Gaxiola go.  He replaced him with Alan Hertzberg from Billy Joel's band. Merryweather produced the second Mama Lion album Give It Every Thing We Got starting it in New York and finishing it in Los Angeles. The internal friction in the band partly caused Lynn Carey's substance abuse and Ripp's constantly saying that she was Mama Lion and not the band.  Merryweather saw the band Mama Lion coming apart and after finishing the production of the album he quit.  The double album that he produced was cut down to a single album and the title was changed to Give It Everything I Got.  The cover featured Lynn Carey alone without a band member anywhere.  Ripp and Carey achieved what they wanted and the band was sent back to Europe for another string of weak tour dates.  The band broke up in Paris and the band members left, leaving Lynn Carey there to pick up the pieces.

Merryweather continued recording demos of his new songs with various members of Mama Lion.  Merryweather invited friend and fellow label artist Billy Joel to the studio to play on some songs. At the time Joel was performing in a downtown Los Angeles bar under the name 'Bill Martin' in an effort to continue playing live, while hiding from Ripp and his label.  On the second of two nights that Joel joined Merryweather in the studio they recorded Joel's "Piano Man" for the first time. Merryweather gave Joel the tape of the recording and it was used the next day to get Joel his recording contract with Columbia Records.

In 1974, Merryweather put a new band together called the Space Rangers.  Through friend Morey Lathower (VP of A&R at Capitol) he was able to secure time at Capitol Records studios and in two nights he recorded the Space Rangers' first album. Merryweather used whatever funds he had left after the Mama Lion years and supported the new band until the money ran out. Unfortunately so did the band's keyboardist and guitarist. Neil's Mama Lion road manager Robbie Randal stuck with Merryweather and took the tape of the Space Rangers album into the office of Skip Taylor (Canned Heat).  When the album was played Slip's brother Jim Taylor heard the new sound and offered to manage Neil.  Taylor got a deal with Mercury Records and Merryweather was signed.  Original Space Rangers drummer Tim McGovern remained loyal to the band and Merryweather hired keyboardist/guitarist Jamie Herndon and lead guitarist Michael Willis and the new band was ready to go. Merryweather bought a Chamberlin keyboard from Sonny & Cher.  The Chamberlin was a key to the Space Rangers sound. The band was booked into the Whiskey when the Space Rangers album was released (1974).  The album went to the No. 5 most added on radio airplay chart in two weeks.  The label did nothing to support the album or the band. Six months later the small advance Merryweather got for Space Rangers was all but gone and in desperation to keep the band together Merryweather took the band into Village Recorders and in five days wrote all the songs, recorded and produced his second album for Mercury called Kryptonite.  The label released it in 1975.  Merryweather disbanded the Space Rangers due to lack of support and weak management.  The Space Rangers and Kryptonite albums received the highest praise from critics worldwide and Kryptonite was voted into the top five Psych Rock albums of the 1970s in an internet poll.  Notable cuts included a cosmic psych rock version of The Byrds' "Eight Miles High" and the David Bowie-inspired single "Hollywood Blvd.", as well as the autobiographical rocker "The Groove".

Merryweather produced two singles for a three-girl-singing-trio he called "Band of Angels", one on Mums Records and one on Midland International. He did three albums at Sound City, The Hollywood Stars, solo artist Kyle, and his own album.  Merryweather recruited Mike Willis and a bunch of his musician friends to record his new album with the help of engineer Mark Smith (Bachman-Turner Overdrive) at the controls.  Merryweather then went to London England.  Ann Munday, the head of Chrysalis Music Publishing signed Merryweather to a publishing deal upon hearing the Sound City recordings. It was through the Chrysalis Music deal that Dureco Records in Amsterdam heard Merryweather's Sound City recordings and signed him to a record deal to release the album. Merryweather named the album Differences due to the variety of writing styles it featured. Dureco asked Merryweather to produce a slew of Dutch bands that were signed to them. One band was called Carlsberg.  Merryweather produced the Carlsberg album and it did well locally in the Netherlands.  His deal with Dureco was to include a new Merryweather album. While Merryweather recorded new demos for Chrysalis in London he found musicians Dave Sinclair (Matching Mole and Camel keyboardist) and Clive Edwards (Pat Travers, UFO and Wild Horses drummer) and guitarist Taff William (Bonnie Tyler and Eyes of Blue). Merryweather ran into Jethro Tull's road manager at Chrysalis and he told him of a great new studio in Miami. Merryweather called the studio and made arrangements to take his new group there to record the new album.  Dureco refused to pay the bill to fly Dave Sinclair's custom Hammond organ to Miami. Dave wouldn't record without his personal gear so he was replaced by Roy Shipston, a friend of Clive Edwards. That was just the beginning of the Dureco Records situation as Merryweather was informed his budget was reduced by half when he arrived in Miami with the band. A week of sessions produced some fine recordings but only one song found its way onto the Differences album just before it was released.  The other songs were only on a Dureco sampler. Merryweather turned to Cees Wessels the ex-head of Phonogram Holland.  Cees was a fan of the Space Rangers and now was the new head of RCA in Amsterdam.  Merryweather met Cees and they inked a deal for him to sign with RCA.  He flew Mike Willis from the Space Rangers over to Amsterdam and they recruited Kees Meerman, the drummer from Herman Brood's Wild Romance and Ken Spence, a saxophonist from Nina Hagen's big band. Merryweather called the band 'Eyes' and the album Radical Genes was recorded.  The band played locally around Amsterdam and they performed at the Hell's Angels Jamboree, but folded soon after due to friction between band members. 

Upon his return to Los Angeles, Merryweather found old Krytonite keyboardist/guitarist Jamie Herndon. Through some Space Rangers fans he found drummer Dusty Watson. Merryweather took them into the studio and he wrote and recorded ten new songs in a few nights.  Dusty had joined the newly formed Lita Ford Band and the bassist Ray Marzano asked Merryweather if he would consider managing the band.  Merryweather had written two songs on the Differences album that Chrysalis music had sent to The Runaways manager Toby Mamis the year before. The songs were being rehearsed by The Runaways for their new album being produced by John Alcock.  The Runaways had broken up during the rehearsals and Lita Ford had gone solo.  Merryweather met with Ford and they became friends and made a deal together.  Merryweather got equipment endorsement deals for the band and a production deal with Fidelity Studios which included monetary support.  He took the band into the studio and began producing tracks.  He used his friendship with Russ Regan at Polygram to help negotiate a deal with the label and Ford.  Merryweather secured a two album guaranteed deal and $300,000 for Ford with Polygram.  During the recording sessions Ray Marzano asked Merryweather to play the bass on the album. Merryweather co-wrote four of the songs on the album including the title song "Out For Blood".  Merryweather did everything he promised Ford he would do and the album was set for release.  He wanted a better management situation for Ford and Shep Gordon was brought in to take over.  To Merryweather's disbelief, Ford rejected him.  Alan Kovacs was then suggested by some people including the label's lawyer. Merryweather was never paid for his management or for the production of the Out For Blood album.  Merryweather had had enough of the music business and after a brief time trying to help Cees Wessels and his newly formed Roadrunner Records sign some Los Angeles metal bands and providing some management assistance to the band Hans Naughty, he quit.  He met and married Victoria Jane Zale. For a while, Merryweather became a photographer and a model builder for the City Of Los Angeles Bureau Engineering under the title "Creative Resources" for Harris and Company, a consulting firm where his wife Victoria managed the West Coast office.
 
When the computer age began to emerge his wife Victoria encouraged him to make music again especially after finding pages of albums and history on the internet. She helped him build a studio in their house.  Merryweather hooked up with Jamie Herndon (guitarist/keyboardist) and Dusty Watson (drums). Merryweather was hired by DIC Entertainment to write and produce songs for two children's TV shows, Super Human Samurai Cyber Squad (ABC) and Tattooed Teenaged Alien Fighters From Beverly Hills (USA).

Merryweather and Herndon wrote and produced forty eight songs in a month's time for those shows.  The trio recorded two albums Hundred Watt Head and The La La Land Blues Band together and continue recording to this day with Herndon, Watson and Hundred Watt Head.  The first Hundred Watt Head album is on iTunes on Ruth McCartney's iFanz label.

In 2015, he made a guest appearance on the Volume Three album by Janne Stark's Mountain of Power. He sang on the tracks "Hey Serena/Wheel Of Fortune Turning". On the album Stark also covered Merryweather's songs "Give It Everything We Got/Kryptonite". The album was released on Grooveyard Records. This spawned further collaboration between them and, in 2016, they started working on an album under the name Merryweather Stark. The album Carved in Rock was released on CD and double vinyl by GMR Music in 2018.
Merryweather was also working on the production of Space Rangers 3 reuniting with drummer Watson.

Merryweather now resides in his Las Vegas home and continues to write and record songs in his Magicbox recording studio.  He has also begun painting and has five paintings currently on display at Las Vegas City Hall. He recently had six of his art pieces in a show called "Soundsations" at UNLV .

In 2020 Merryweather Stark released their second album Rock Solid (GMR Music) on CD and LP. Neil also participated on the 'Volume Four album by Janne Stark's Mountain of Power, where he sang on the songs In My Eyes (originally by Three Man Army) and Sweet Wealth (originally by the band Rockicks). Late 2020 Swedish label Regain Record started working on re-issuing Neil's Kryptonite and Space Rangers albums. They were re-mastered by Janne Stark, who also mixed the bonus tracks featured on the releases. 

On March 29, 2021, Merryweather died in Las Vegas, Nevada, after a short illness.

DiscographyMerryweather (with Merryweather) (Capitol, 1969)Word of Mouth (with Merryweather) (Capitol, 1969)Neil Merryweather, John Richardson and Boers (Kent, 1970)Ivar Avenue Reunion (with Barry Goldberg, Charlie Musselwhite, Lynn Carey) (RCA, 1970)Vacuum Cleaner (with Lynn Carey) (RCA, 1971)Preserve Wildlife (with Mama Lion) (Family Productions, 1972)Heavy Cruiser (with Heavy Cruiser) (Family Productions, 1972)Lucky Dog (with Heavy Cruiser) (Family Productions, 1973)Give It Everything I've Got (with Mama Lion) (Family Productions, 1973)Space Rangers (Mercury, 1974)Kryptonite (with Space Rangers) (Mercury, 1975)Differences (1978)Radical Genes (with Eyes) (1980)Hundred Watt Head (with Hundred Watt Head) (2009)The La La Land Blues Band (with The La La Land Blues Band) (2009)Carved in Rock (with Merryweather Stark) (2018)Neil Merryweather and Hundred Watt Head Too (with Hundred Watt Head) (2019)Red (with Hundred Watt Head) (2019)Rock Solid'' (with Merryweather Stark) (2020)

Sources
Specific

Others
 Ever Heard Of - Stan Endersby
 Canadian Bands.com - Merryweather
 Bill Munson, interview with Ed Roth, 1976
 Nick Warburton, interview with Neil Merryweather, 2005
 The Toronto Telegram's After Four section
 GROOVEYARD RECORDS - MOUNTAIN OF POWER - VOLUME THREE

1945 births
2021 deaths
Canadian rock singers
Canadian male singers
Canadian rock bass guitarists
Musicians from Winnipeg
Male bass guitarists